Ye Peiqiong (born 1937), also known as Yei Pei-chun, is a female former international table tennis player from China.

Table tennis career
She won two bronze medals at the 1957 World Table Tennis Championships and the 1959 World Table Tennis Championships in the Corbillon Cup (women's team event) for China.

She also won a national title in 1959.

See also
 List of table tennis players
 List of World Table Tennis Championships medalists

References

Chinese female table tennis players
1937 births
Living people
Table tennis players from Guangzhou
World Table Tennis Championships medalists